Whoo Hyun (born January 5, 1987) is a South Korean football player.

External links
 

1987 births
Living people
South Korean footballers
Bucheon FC 1995 players
Seoul Pabal FC players
Daejeon Hana Citizen FC players
Whoo Hyun
Whoo Hyun
K League 2 players
K3 League players
Whoo Hyun
Expatriate footballers in Thailand
South Korean expatriate sportspeople in Thailand
Whoo Hyun
Whoo Hyun
Footballers from Seoul
Expatriate footballers in Cambodia
Association football defenders
Whoo Hyun